That's Entertainment may refer to:

 "That's Entertainment!" (song), from the 1953 musical film The Band Wagon
 That's Entertainment! (album), 1960 recording by Judy Garland
 That's Entertainment!, 1974 retrospective celebrating the films of Metro-Goldwyn-Mayer
That's Entertainment, Part II, 1976 sequel to That's Entertainment!
That's Entertainment! Part III, 1994 sequel toThat's Entertainment!
 "That's Entertainment" (The Jam song), 1980 recording from the album Sound Affects
 That's Entertainment (comic shop), founded in 1980 in Worcester, Massachusetts, U.S.
 That's Entertainment (Philippine TV program), Philippine teen variety show broadcast from 1986 to 1996
 That's Entertainment (album), 2000 recording by the Japanese group Cymbals
 That's Entertainment (Emirati TV program), weekly celebrity gossip show launched in 2011
 "That's Entertainment" (Gotham), 2018 episode of Gotham
 "That's Entertainment" (Hazbin Hotel), 2019 episode of Hazbin Hotel
 "That's Entertainment" (Johnny Bravo), a 2004 episode of Johnny Bravo